Forrest Welch Bennett (born August 13, 1989) is an American politician who has served in the Oklahoma House of Representatives from the 92nd district since 2016.

Early life 
Bennett was born on August 13, 1989 in Bartlesville, Oklahoma to Kevin and Cindy Bennett. He graduated from Bartlesville High School in 2008 and enrolled at the University of Oklahoma. While at OU, Bennett was involved with student government, including the Oklahoma Intercollegiate Legislature, and ran for OU student body president in 2011. He graduated from OU with a bachelor's degree in political science in 2012 and completed his masters in public administration in 2016. Following graduation, Bennett worked for a political consulting firm and the public education advocacy group Stand For Children.

Political career 
In 2016, Bennett was one of three Democratic candidates who filed in Oklahoma House District 92 to replace Richard Morrissette, who could not run for re-election due to term limits. During the campaign, Bennett made headlines for having his vehicle stolen while campaigning. After securing his party's nomination, Bennett defeated Republican challenger Joe Griffin to win his seat.

Bennett ran unopposed for re-election in 2018.

Personal life 
Bennett has two brothers, and stated “(g)rowing up as the middle child among three brothers has definitely helped me to understand the importance of compromise and negotiation.” Bennett is married to OKCPS board member Meg McElhaney

Election Results

References

1989 births
Living people
Democratic Party members of the Oklahoma House of Representatives
People from Bartlesville, Oklahoma
21st-century American politicians